The Lonesome Dove series is a series of four western fiction novels written by Larry McMurtry and the five television miniseries and television series based upon them.

Overview
The novels and miniseries follow the exploits of several members of the Texas Ranger Division from the time of the Republic of Texas up until the beginning of the 20th century. Recurring characters include Augustus "Gus" McCrae, Woodrow F. Call, Joshua Deets, Pea Eye Parker, Jake Spoon, Clara Forsythe Allen, Maggie Tilton, Lorena Wood Parker, Blue Duck, and Buffalo Hump. The series is set within historical events and characters, although they are often adapted or altered to accommodate the fictional timelines of the main characters.

Novels
In order of publication:
 Lonesome Dove (1985)
 Streets of Laredo (1993)
 Dead Man's Walk (1995)
 Comanche Moon (1997)

In order of internal chronology:
 Dead Man's Walk – set in the early 1840s
 Comanche Moon – set in the 1850–60s
 Lonesome Dove – set in mid-to-late 1870s
 Streets of Laredo – set in the early 1890s

Television miniseries
 Lonesome Dove (1989)
 Return to Lonesome Dove (1993) – This miniseries is set a year after the events of Lonesome Dove. The story was written by John Wilder. McMurtry was not involved in the production of this and he was not happy when CBS implied that he was a collaborator.
 Streets of Laredo (1995)
 Dead Man's Walk (1996)
 Comanche Moon (2008)

Recurring characters
Actors for characters based on the chronology of the series. Note that Wes Studi played two roles, Famous Shoes in Streets of Laredo and Buffalo Hump in Comanche Moon.

Television series

 Lonesome Dove: The Series

References

External links
 
 

 
Series of books